Vampire Vs Vampire (一眉道人) is a 1989 Hong Kong comedy horror film directed by and starring Lam Ching-ying. The title references the interaction in the film between a jiangshi child, a creature from Chinese "hopping" corpse fiction, and a British vampire based on Western vampire fiction.

Synopsis
Chinese exorcist One-Eyebrow Priest (Lam Ching-ying) leads a peaceful life with two disciples Ah Ho (Chin Siu-ho) and Ah Fong (David Lui) in a small town together with a mischievous miniature jiangshi. While finding new water sources one day, the priest encounters a European vampire in the nearby church who is aided by a dead countess. Although the priest manages to get rid of the countess, his Chinese exorcism fails on the European vampire.

Cast
Lam Ching-ying as One Eyebrow Priest
Chin Siu-ho as Ah Hoo
David Lui as Ah Fong
Maria Cordero as Mother Superior
Billy Lau as General
Sandra Ng as General's Cousin
Regina Kent as Nun
Frank Juhas as European vampire

Home media

Laserdisc

VCD

DVD

References

External links

Vampire Vs. Vampire at Hong Kong Cinemagic
Vampire Vs. Vampire at Love Hong Kong Film

1989 films
1989 horror films
Films directed by Lam Ching Ying
Hong Kong action comedy films
Hong Kong martial arts films
1980s monster movies
Martial arts horror films
Martial arts comedy films
1989 action comedy films
Jiangshi films
1989 martial arts films
1980s comedy horror films
Mr. Vampire
Golden Harvest films
Vampire comedy films
1989 directorial debut films
1990s Hong Kong films
1980s Hong Kong films